Christopher Greene (born 13 February 1988) is an Irish broadcaster and comedian. He has hosted the radio show Chris and Ciara on RTÉ 2fm with Ciara King since the pair left iRadio in 2014, and stars with Peter Ganley in the series Craic Addicts, produced for Channel 4's on-demand service 4oD.

Broadcasting career
Radio

Greene began his broadcasting career on college radio station Flirt FM in 2005 at 17 years of age and moved to commercial radio station iRadio in 2007. Chris was the youngest person to be selected from a nationwide talent search of over 400 applicants for on air personalities.  
 
Presenting both night and daytime slots on regional station iRadio with Ciara King, the pair developed a loyal and considerable following. This led to the duo being headhunted in 2014 to form part of the new schedule for national station RTÉ 2fm

Television/ On Demand video content

While working in iRadio Chris met fellow broadcaster/ entertainer Peter Ganley. In 2011 Peter founded production company Final Boss Media, Chris joined him shortly after and to date the company continues to work with some sizable clients, producing video content for Paddy Power, Yahoo! , RTÉ Two , TV3 and Channel 4  as well as a YouTube channel, Epic News with Peter and Chris with over 10 million views.

References

External links
 
 

1988 births
Irish radio presenters
People from County Galway
Living people
RTÉ 2fm presenters